Pine Grove is an unincorporated community in Ouachita Parish, Louisiana, United States.

References

Unincorporated communities in Ouachita Parish, Louisiana
Unincorporated communities in Louisiana
Unincorporated communities in Monroe, Louisiana metropolitan area